The Santee Canal was one of the earliest canals built in the United States. It was built to provide a direct water route between Charleston and Columbia, the new South Carolina state capital. It was named to the National Register of Historic Places in 1982.

History 
In 1786, the South Carolina General Assembly chartered a company to construct and maintain the inland canal linking the Cooper River near Charleston, with the Santee River. The Santee River connects to the Congaree River and the City of Columbia. Construction started in 1793 under the direction of Engineer Col. John Christian Senf. It opened in 1800.

It had two double locks and eight single locks.

Due to low traffic, poor construction, and droughts, the canal was not a financial success. The construction of railroads sealed its fate. It lost its state charter in 1853. It was not used after 1865. Much of it was flooded by the construction of Lake Moultrie.

Additional pictures and information are available from the Historic American Buildings Survey at the Library of Congress. Old Santee Canal Park is located in Moncks Corner, South Carolina. The park is situated at Stony Landing, the former southernmost section of the canal.

References

External links

 Porcher, F. A. 1809-1888. (1903). The history of the Santee Canal. Charleston, S.C.: South Carolina Historical Society. Accessed June 12, 2018.

See also

List of canals in the United States

Canals on the National Register of Historic Places in South Carolina
Canals in South Carolina
Buildings and structures in Berkeley County, South Carolina
Transportation in Berkeley County, South Carolina
Historic American Buildings Survey in South Carolina
National Register of Historic Places in Berkeley County, South Carolina
Canals opened in 1800
1800 establishments in South Carolina